Neadmete circumcincta is a species of sea snail, a marine gastropod mollusk in the family Cancellariidae, the nutmeg snails.

Description
The shell grows to a length of 22 mm.

Distribution
This species occurs in the Pacific Ocean from Alaska to British Columbia, Canada

References

 Petit, R.E. & Harasewych, M.G. (2005) Catalogue of the superfamily Cancellarioidea Forbes and Hanley, 1851 (Gastropoda: Prosobranchia)- 2nd edition. Zootaxa, 1102, 3–161. NIZT 682
 Hemmen J. (2007). Recent Cancellariidae. Wiesbaden, 428pp.

Cancellariidae